English Sheepdog may refer (vaguely) to either of two dog breeds:

English Shepherd
Old English Sheepdog